Darzi Kola-ye Aqa Shafi (also Romanized as Darzī Kolā-ye Āqā Shafī‘; also known as Āqā Shafī‘) is a village in Lalehabad Rural District, Lalehabad District, Babol County, Mazandaran Province, Iran. At the 2006 census, its population was 1,022, in 258 families.

References 

Populated places in Babol County